Sheryl Gething (born 16 February 1994), better known by her stage name Shae is an Indonesian singer and actress. She was born to an Australian father and Indonesian mother from Riau.

Singing career 
Sheryl began her singing career when she was 15 years old. She was three years in the Farabi vocal school, then went on to private lessons vocal teacher Katamsi Doddy. She released her first album under Warner Music Indonesia titled The First in 2012 when she was 18 years old. The 2nd single of the album titled "Sayang" became a hit in Malaysia when it was released.

Her second album Seperti Magic was officially released on February 16 and producing first single "Aku Suka Kamu" which performed and also promoted in several events.

Discography

Studio albums 
 The First (2012)

 Seperti Magic (2016)

Singles 
 "Kok Telfon-Telfon Sih" (2012)
 "Sayang" (2013)
 "Aku Suka Kamu" (2015)
 "Gojigo (K.A.M.U.)" (2015)

Filmography

Film

Television

References 

1994 births
Living people
Indo people
Indonesian people of Australian descent
Indonesian people of Malay descent
21st-century Indonesian women singers
Indonesian actresses